Tha Wang Tan is a tambon (subdistrict) of Saraphi District, in Chiang Mai Province, Thailand. In 2020 it had a total population of 11,039 people.

Administration

Central administration
The tambon is subdivided into 13 administrative villages (muban).

Local administration
The whole area of the subdistrict is covered by the subdistrict municipality (Thesaban Tambon) Tha Wang Tan (เทศบาลตำบลท่าวังตาล).

References

External links
Thaitambon.com on Tha Wang Tan

Tambon of Chiang Mai province
Populated places in Chiang Mai province